The κ-opioid receptor or kappa opioid receptor, abbreviated KOR or KOP for its ligand ketazocine, is a G protein-coupled receptor that in humans is encoded by the OPRK1 gene. The KOR is coupled to the G protein Gi/G0 and is one of four related receptors that bind opioid-like compounds in the brain and are responsible for mediating the effects of these compounds. These effects include altering nociception, consciousness, motor control, and mood. Dysregulation of this receptor system has been implicated in alcohol and drug addiction.

The KOR is a type of opioid receptor that binds the opioid peptide dynorphin as the primary endogenous ligand (substrate naturally occurring in the body). In addition to dynorphin, a variety of natural alkaloids, terpenes and  synthetic ligands bind to the receptor. The KOR may provide a natural addiction control mechanism, and therefore, drugs that target this receptor may have therapeutic potential in the treatment of addiction.

There is evidence that distribution and/or function of this receptor may differ between sexes.

Distribution 
KORs are widely distributed in the brain, spinal cord (substantia gelatinosa), and in peripheral tissues. High levels of the receptor have been detected in the prefrontal cortex, periaqueductal gray, raphe nuclei (dorsal), ventral tegmental area, substantia nigra, dorsal striatum (putamen, caudate), ventral striatum (nucleus accumbens, olfactory tubercle), amygdala, bed nucleus stria terminalis, claustrum, hippocampus, hypothalamus, midline thalamic nuclei, locus coeruleus, spinal trigeminal nucleus, parabrachial nucleus, and solitary nucleus.

Subtypes 
Based on receptor binding studies, three variants of the KOR designated κ1, κ2, and κ3 have been characterized. However, only one cDNA clone has been identified, hence these receptor subtypes likely arise from interaction of one KOR protein with other membrane associated proteins.

All opioid receptors exist as obligate dimers. The implications this may have are not totally known.

Function

Pain
Similarly to μ-opioid receptor (MOR) agonists, KOR agonists are potently analgesic, and have been employed clinically in the treatment of pain. However, KOR agonists also produce side effects such as dysphoria, hallucinations, and dissociation, which has limited their clinical usefulness. Examples of KOR agonists that have been used medically as analgesics include butorphanol, nalbuphine, levorphanol, levallorphan, pentazocine, phenazocine, and eptazocine. Difelikefalin (CR845, FE-202845) and CR665 (FE-200665, JNJ-38488502) are peripherally restricted KOR agonists lacking the CNS side effects of centrally active KOR agonists and are currently under clinical investigation as analgesics.

Consciousness 
Centrally active KOR agonists have hallucinogenic or dissociative effects, as exemplified by salvinorin A (the active constituent in Salvia divinorum). These effects are generally undesirable in medicinal drugs. It is thought that the hallucinogenic and dysphoric effects of opioids such as butorphanol, nalbuphine, and pentazocine serve to limit their abuse potential. In the case of salvinorin A, a structurally novel neoclerodane diterpene KOR agonist, these hallucinogenic effects are sought by recreational users, despite the dysphoria experienced by some users.  Another KOR agonist with comparable effects is ibogaine, which has possible medical application in addiction treatment. While these KOR agonists possess hallucinogenic and dissociative effects, they are mechanistically and qualitatively different from those of the 5HT2AR agonist psychedelic hallucinogens such as lysergic acid diethylamide (LSD) or psilocybin and those of NMDAR antagonist dissociatives/anesthetics ketamine and phencyclidine.

The claustrum is the region of the brain in which the KOR is most densely expressed. It has been proposed that this area, based on its structure and connectivity, has "a role in coordinating a set of diverse brain functions", and the claustrum has been elucidated as playing a crucial role in consciousness. As examples, lesions of the claustrum in humans are associated with disruption of consciousness and cognition, and electrical stimulation of the area between the insula and the claustrum has been found to produce an immediate loss of consciousness in humans along with recovery of consciousness upon cessation of the stimulation. On the basis of the preceding knowledge, it has been proposed that inhibition of the claustrum (as well as, "additionally, the deep layers of the cortex, mainly in prefrontal areas") by activation of KORs in these areas is primarily responsible for the profound consciousness-altering/dissociative hallucinogen effects of salvinorin A and other KOR agonists. In addition, it has been stated that "the subjective effects of S. divinorum indicate that salvia disrupts certain facets of consciousness much more than the largely serotonergic hallucinogen [LSD]", and it has been postulated that inhibition of a brain area that is apparently as fundamentally involved in consciousness and higher cognitive function as the claustrum may explain this. However, these conclusions are merely tentative, as "[KORs] are not exclusive to the claustrum; there is also a fairly high density of receptors located in the prefrontal cortex, hippocampus, nucleus accumbens and putamen", and "disruptions to other brain regions could also explain the consciousness-altering effects [of salvinorin A]".

In supplementation of the above, according to Addy et al.:

Mood, stress, and addiction

The involvement of the KOR in stress, as well as in consequences of chronic stress such as depression, anxiety, anhedonia, and increased drug-seeking behavior, has been made clear. KOR agonists are notably dysphoric and aversive at sufficient doses. The KOR antagonists buprenorphine, as ALKS-5461 (a combination formulation with samidorphan), and CERC-501 (LY-2456302) are currently in clinical development for the treatment of major depressive disorder and substance use disorders. JDTic and PF-4455242 were also under investigation but development was halted in both cases due to toxicity concerns.

The depressive-like behaviors following prolonged morphine abstinence appear to be mediated by upregulation of the KOR/dynorphin system in the nucleus accumbens, as the local application of a KOR antagonist prevented the behaviors. As such, KOR antagonists might be useful for the treatment of depressive symptoms associated with opioid withdrawal.

In a small clinical study, pentazocine, a KOR agonist, was found to rapidly and substantially reduce symptoms of mania in patients with bipolar disorder. It was postulated that the efficacy observed was due to KOR activation-mediated amelioration of excessive dopaminergic signaling in the reward pathways.

Others 
A variety of other effects of KOR activation are known:

 Activation of the KOR appears to antagonize many of the effects of the MOR, including analgesia, tolerance, euphoria, and memory regulation. Nalorphine and nalmefene are dual MOR antagonists and KOR agonists that have been used clinically as antidotes for opioid overdose, although the specific role and significance of KOR activation in this indication, if any, is uncertain. In any case however, KOR agonists notably do not affect respiratory drive, and hence do not reverse MOR activation-induced respiratory depression.
 KOR agonists suppress itching, and the selective KOR agonist nalfurafine is used clinically as an antipruritic (anti-itch drug).
 Eluxadoline is a peripherally restricted KOR agonist as well as MOR agonist and DOR antagonist that has been approved for the treatment of diarrhea-predominant irritable bowel syndrome. Asimadoline and fedotozine are selective and similarly peripherally restricted KOR agonists that were also investigated for the treatment of irritable bowel syndrome and reportedly demonstrated at least some efficacy for this indication but were ultimately never marketed.
 KOR agonists are known for their characteristic diuretic effects, due to their negative regulation of vasopressin, also known as antidiuretic hormone (ADH).
 KOR agonism is neuroprotective against hypoxia/ischemia.
 The selective KOR agonist U-50488 protected rats against supramaximal electroshock seizures, indicating that KOR agonism may have anticonvulsant effects.

Signal transduction 
KOR activation by agonists is coupled to the G protein Gi/G0, which subsequently increases phosphodiesterase activity. Phosphodiesterases break down cAMP, producing an inhibitory effect in neurons. KORs also couple to inward-rectifier potassium and to N-type calcium ion channels. Recent studies have also demonstrated that agonist-induced stimulation of the KOR, like other G-protein coupled receptors, can result in the activation of mitogen-activated protein kinases (MAPK). These include extracellular signal-regulated kinase, p38 mitogen-activated protein kinases, and c-Jun N-terminal kinases.

Ligands

Agonists 
The synthetic alkaloid ketazocine and terpenoid natural product salvinorin A are potent and selective KOR agonists. The KOR also mediates the dysphoria and hallucinations seen with opioids such as pentazocine.

Benzomorphans
 Alazocine– partial agonist
 Bremazocine – highly selective
 8-Carboxamidocyclazocine
 Cyclazocine – partial agonist
 Ketazocine
 Metazocine – partial agonist
 Pentazocine – partial agonist
 Phenazocine – partial agonist

Morphinans
 6'-Guanidinonaltrindole (6'-GNTI) – biased ligand: G protein agonist, β-arrestin antagonist
 Butorphan – full agonist
 Butorphanol – partial agonist
 Cyclorphan – full agonist
 Diprenorphine – non-selective, partial agonist
 Etorphine – non-selective
 Levallorphan
 Levomethorphan
 Levorphanol
 Morphine – alkaloid
 Nalbuphine – partial agonist
 Nalfurafine – full agonist, atypical agonist (possibly biased or subtype-selective)
 Nalmefene – partial agonist
 Nalodeine
 Nalorphine – partial agonist
 Norbuprenorphine – partial agonist, peripherally-selective metabolite of buprenorphine
 Norbuprenorphine-3-glucuronide – likely partial agonist, peripherally-selective metabolite of buprenorphine
 Oxilorphan – partial agonist
 Oxycodone – selective for κ2b subtype
 Proxorphan – partial agonist
 Samidorphan – non-selective, weak partial agonist
 Xorphanol – partial agonist

Arylacetamides
 Asimadoline – peripherally-selective
 BRL-52537
 Eluxadoline
 Enadoline
 GR-89696 – selective for κ2
 ICI-204,448 – peripherally-selective
 ICI-199,441
 LPK-26 – highly selective
 MB-1C-OH 
 Niravoline
 N-MPPP 
 Spiradoline
 U-50,488
 U-54,494A 
 U-69,593

Peptides (endo-/exogenous)
 CR665 – peripherally-selective 
 Difelikefalin (CR845) – peripherally-selective 
 Dynorphins (dynorphin A, dynorphin B, big dynorphin)

Terpenoids
 Collybolide – biased agonist
 Erinacine E
 Menthol
 RB-64 – G protein biased agonist with a bias factor of 96; β-arrestin antagonist
 Salvinorin A – naturally-occurring
 2-Methoxymethyl salvinorin B – and its ethoxymethyl and fluoroethoxymethyl homologues

Others/unsorted
 Apadoline
 HS665 
 HZ-2
 Ibogaine – alkaloid
 Ketamine (weak)
 Noribogaine – non-selective, biased ligand: G protein agonist, β-arrestin antagonist
 Tifluadom – (atypical) benzodiazepine
 Mirtazapine - partial agonist at high concentrations 

Nalfurafine (Remitch), which was introduced in 2009, is the first selective KOR agonist to enter clinical use.

Antagonists 

 5'-Acetamidinoethylnaltrindole (ANTI) – selective 
 5'-Guanidinonaltrindole (5'-GNTI) – selective, long-acting
 6'-Guanidinonaltrindole (6'-GNTI) – biased ligand: G protein agonist, β-arrestin antagonist
 Amentoflavone – non-selective; naturally-occurring
 AT-076 – non-selective, likely long acting; JDTic analogue
 Aticaprant – selective, short-acting
 Binaltorphimine – selective, long-acting
 BTRX-335140 - selective
 BU09059 – selective, short-acting; JDTic analogue
 Buprenorphine – non-selective; silent antagonist or weak partial agonist, depending on source
 CVL-354 – selective, short-acting
 Dezocine – non-selective; silent antagonist
 DIPPA – selective, long-acting 
 JDTic – selective, long-acting
 LY-255582 - non-selective
 LY-2459989 – selective, short-acting
 LY-2795050 – selective, short-acting
 Methylnaltrexone – non-selective
 ML190 – selective 
 ML350 – selective, short-acting
 MR-2266 – non-selective
 Naloxone – non-selective
 Naltrexone – non-selective
 Noribogaine – non-selective; naturally-occurring; biased ligand: G protein agonist, β-arrestin antagonist
 Norbinaltorphimine – selective, long-acting
 Pawhuskin A – selective; naturally-occurring
 PF-4455242 – selective, short-acting
 Quadazocine – non-selective; silent antagonist; preference for κ2
 RB-64 (22-thiocyanatosalvinorin A) – G protein biased agonist with a bias factor of 96; β-arrestin antagonist
 Zyklophin – selective peptide antagonist; dynorphin A analogue

Natural agonists

Mentha spp. 

Found in numerous species of mint, (including peppermint, spearmint, and watermint), the naturally-occurring compound menthol is a weak KOR agonist owing to its antinociceptive, or pain blocking, effects in rats. In addition, mints can desensitize a region through the activation of TRPM8 receptors (the 'cold'/menthol receptor).

Salvia divinorum 

The key compound in Salvia divinorum, salvinorin A, is known as a powerful, short-acting KOR agonist.

Ibogaine 

Used for the treatment of addiction in limited countries, ibogaine has become an icon of addiction management among certain underground circles. Despite its lack of addictive properties, ibogaine is listed as a Schedule I compound in the US because it is a psychoactive substance, hence it is considered illegal to possess under any circumstances. Ibogaine is also a KOR agonist and this property may contribute to the drug's anti-addictive efficacy.

Mitragyna speciosa

Rhodocollybia maculata

Role in treatment of drug addiction
KOR agonists had been investigated for their therapeutic potential in the treatment of addiction and evidence points towards dynorphin, the endogenous KOR agonist, to be the body's natural addiction control mechanism. Childhood stress/abuse is a well known predictor of drug abuse and is reflected in alterations of the MOR and KOR systems. In experimental "addiction" models the KOR has also been shown to influence stress-induced relapse to drug seeking behavior. For the drug-dependent individual, risk of relapse is a major obstacle to becoming drug-free. Recent reports demonstrated that KORs are required for stress-induced reinstatement of cocaine seeking.

One area of the brain most strongly associated with addiction is the nucleus accumbens (NAcc) and striatum while other structures that project to and from the NAcc also play a critical role. Though many other changes occur, addiction is often characterized by the reduction of dopamine D2 receptors in the NAcc. In addition to low NAcc D2 binding, cocaine is also known to produce a variety of changes to the primate brain such as increases prodynorphin mRNA in caudate putamen (striatum) and decreases of the same in the hypothalamus while the administration of a KOR agonist produced an opposite effect causing an increase in D2 receptors in the NAcc.

Additionally, while cocaine overdose victims showed a large increase in KORs (doubled) in the NAcc, KOR agonist administration is shown to be effective in decreasing cocaine seeking and self-administration. Furthermore, while cocaine abuse is associated with lowered prolactin response, KOR activation causes a release in prolactin, a hormone known for its important role in learning, neuronal plasticity and myelination.

It has also been reported that the KOR system is critical for stress-induced drug-seeking. In animal models, stress has been demonstrated to potentiate cocaine reward behavior in a kappa opioid-dependent manner. These effects are likely caused by stress-induced drug craving that requires activation of the KOR system. Although seemingly paradoxical, it is well known that drug taking results in a change from homeostasis to allostasis. It has been suggested that withdrawal-induced dysphoria or stress-induced dysphoria may act as a driving force by which the individual seeks alleviation via drug taking. The rewarding properties of drug are altered, and it is clear KOR activation following stress modulates the valence of drug to increase its rewarding properties and cause potentiation of reward behavior, or reinstatement to drug seeking. The stress-induced activation of KORs is likely due to multiple signaling mechanisms. The effects of KOR agonism on dopamine systems are well documented, and recent work also implicates the mitogen-activated protein kinase cascade and pCREB in KOR-dependent behaviors.

While the predominant drugs of abuse examined have been cocaine (44%), ethanol (35%), and opioids (24%). As these are different classes of drugs of abuse working through different receptors (increasing dopamine directly and indirectly, respectively) albeit in the same systems produce functionally different responses. Conceptually then pharmacological activation of KOR can have marked effects in any of the psychiatric disorders (depression, bipolar disorder, anxiety, etc.) as well as various neurological disorders (i.e. Parkinson's disease and Huntington's disease). Not only are genetic differences in dynorphin receptor expression a marker for alcohol dependence but a single dose of a KOR antagonist markedly increased alcohol consumption in lab animals. There are numerous studies that reflect a reduction in self-administration of alcohol, and heroin dependence has also been shown to be effectively treated with KOR agonism by reducing the immediate rewarding effects and by causing the curative effect of up-regulation (increased production) of MORs that have been down-regulated during opioid abuse.

The anti-rewarding properties of KOR agonists are mediated through both long-term and short-term effects. The immediate effect of KOR agonism leads to reduction of dopamine release in the NAcc during self-administration of cocaine and over the long term up-regulates receptors that have been down-regulated during substance abuse such as the MOR and the D2 receptor. These receptors modulate the release of other neurochemicals such as serotonin in the case of MOR agonists and acetylcholine in the case of D2. These changes can account for the physical and psychological remission of the pathology of addiction. The longer effects of KOR agonism (30 minutes or greater) have been linked to KOR-dependent stress-induced potentiation and reinstatement of drug seeking. It is hypothesized that these behaviors are mediated by KOR-dependent modulation of dopamine, serotonin, or norepinephrine and/or via activation of downstream signal transduction pathways.

Of significant note, while KOR activation blocks many of the behavioral and neurochemical responses elicited by drugs of abuse as stated above. These results are indicative of the KOR induced negative affective states counteracting the rewarding effects of drugs of abuse. Implicating the KOR/dynorphin system as an anti-reward system, supported by the role of KOR signaling and stress, mediating both stress-induced potentiation of drug reward and stress-induced reinstatement of seeking behavior. This in turn addresses what was thought to be paradoxical above. That is, rather, KOR signaling is activated/upregulated by stress, drugs of abuse and agonist administration - resulting in negative affective state. As such drug addiction is maintained by avoidance of negative affective states manifest in stress, craving, and drug withdrawal. Consistent with KOR induced negative affective states and role in drug addiction, KOR antagonists are efficacious at blocking negative affect induced by drug withdrawal and at decreasing escalated drug intake in pre-clinical trial involving extended drug access. Clinically there has been little advancement to evaluate the effects of KOR antagonists due to adverse effects and undesirable pharmacological profiles for clinical testing (i.e. long half-life, poor bioavailability). More recently, a selective, high-affinity KOR antagonist LY2456302 was well-tolerated in CUD patients. Showing feasibility a subsequent proof-of-mechanism trial evaluated JNJ-67953964 (previously LY2456302) potential for treating anhedonia in a double-blind, placebo-controlled, randomized trial in patients with anhedonia and a mood or anxiety disorder. The KOR antagonist significantly increased fMRI ventral striatum activation during reward anticipation while accompanied by therapeutic effects on clinical measures of anhedonia, further reinforces the promise of KOR antagonism and proceeding assessment of clinical impact. Additionally a positron emission tomography (PET) study in cocaine use disorder (CUD) patients utilizing a KOR selective agonist [11C]GR103545 radioligand showed CUD individuals with higher KOR availability were more prone to stress-induced relapse. A subsequent PET scan following a three-day cocaine binge showed a decrease in KOR availability, interpreted as increased endogenous dynorphin competing with the radioligand at the KOR binding sites. Taken together these findings are in support of the negative affect state and further implicate the KOR/dynorphin system clinically and therapeutically relevant in humans with CUD. 
Taken together, in drug addiction the KOR/dynorphin system is implicated as a homeostatic mechanism to counteract the acute effects of drugs of abuse. Chronic drug use and stress up-regulate the system in turn leading to a dysregulated state which induces negative affective states and stress reactivity.

Interactions 

KOR has been shown to interact with sodium-hydrogen antiporter 3 regulator 1, ubiquitin C, 5-HT1A receptor, and RGS12.

See also 
 δ-opioid receptor
 μ-opioid receptor
 Nociceptin receptor

References

External links 
 
 

Opioid receptors
Kappa-opioid receptor agonists